Boone County Airport  is a privately owned, public use airport located two nautical miles (2.3 mi, 3.7 km) southeast of the central business district of Lebanon, a city in Boone County, Indiana, United States.

Facilities and aircraft 
It has one runway designated 18/36 with a concrete surface measuring 3,600 by 30 feet (1,097 x 9 m).

For the 12-month period ending December 31, 2013, the airport had 4,426 general aviation aircraft operations, an average of 12 per day. In November 2016, there were 37 aircraft based at this airport: 34 single-engine, 2 multi-engine and 1 ultralight.

See also
Boone County Airport (Arkansas) and Boone County Airport (Kentucky)

References

External links 
 Aerial photo from INDOT Airport Directory
 Aerial photo as of 4 March 1999 from USGS The National Map
 

Airports in Indiana
Transportation buildings and structures in Boone County, Indiana